Born in Babylon is the third full-length studio album by reggae band SOJA. It was released August 25, 2009 exclusively on iTunes, through DMV Records. Physical copies can also be bought at concerts where the band uses a "Pay What You Want" pricing model.

Track listing 
All tracks by Jacob Hemphill except where noted.
 "Born in Babylon" – 4:36.
 "Losing My Mind" – 5:36.
 "Used to Matter" – 4:19.
 "Bleed Through" (ft. Black Boo of Mambo Sauce) (Alfred Duncan, Hemphill) – 6:30. 
 "You and Me" (ft. Chris Boomer) – 5:10.
 "Don't Forget" – 3:00. 
 "Decide You're Gone" – 4:32.
 "I Don't Wanna Wait " – 5:57.
 "I Tried" (ft. Gentleman and Tamika) (Gentleman, Hemphill) – 4:54.
 "Never Ever" – 3:34.
 "Summer Breeze" (Hemphill, Bobby Lee) – 5.09.
 "Waking Up" – 6.08
 "Thunderstorms" – 7:01 
 "Here I Am" (ft. Marley, Rory, and Eric of Rebelution) – 4:48
 "Rest of My Life (Bonus track)" - 5:16.

Personnel 
Eddie Drennon – violin
Michael McCormick – piano
Patrick O'Shea – organ, keyboards
Christopher Wight – keyboards
Julius Wirth – viola

References

External links
SOJAmusic.com

SOJA albums
2009 albums